Carmen Reppel is a German soprano active in both opera and concert. She also explored lesser-known repertoire such as Siegfried Wagner's  and appeared in contemporary operas, singing in world premieres of operas by Aribert Reimann and Flavio Testi.

Career 

Reppel was born in Bergneustadt. Her early studies were with Gisela Aulmann. At the Musikhochschule Hamburg, in addition to completing a diploma in music theory and history, acting, and diction, she did practical vocal studies with the Erna Berger. Later, she also studied with Alexander Kolo in Vienna.

Opera 
At the Bayreuth Festival, starting in 1977, she performed several roles in the centenary production of Wagner's , staged by Patrice Chéreau. Reppel performed as a lead Blumenmädchen in Wolfgang Wagner's production of Parsifal from 1977 to 1980. In 1983, she sang the leading part of Hulda in concert performances of Siegfried Wagner's opera  in Solingen.

Starting in 1985, she appeared as Leonore in Beethoven's Fidelio at the Hamburg State Opera and the Zurich Opera, and as Chrysothemis, Sieglinde, Elsa, Eva, Salome, and Arabella at the Vienna State Opera. She also sang the role of Chrysothemis in Prague with the Prague Philharmonic under Vaclav Neumann. She sang the Empress at La Scala in the Ponnelle production conducted by Wolfgang Sawallisch, as well as the title role of Salome at the same theatre. She also sang Elsa and Leonora (Fidelio) in Tokyo with the NHK orchestra, conducted respectively by Wolfgang Sawallisch and Ferdinand Leitner. Other parts in her repertoire as a lirico-spinto soprano are Mozart's Fiordiligi and both Donna Anna and Donna Elvira in his Don Giovanni, Marie, the title role of Bedřich Smetana's Prodaná nevěsta (a part which she sang in a TV production), Verdi's  Leonora, Traviata and Desdemona, Puccini's Mimi and Liu, and a title role in Claude Debussy's .

Reppel took part in several premieres. On 7 July 1986, at the Bavarian State Opera, Munich, she premiered the part of Andromache in the world premiere of Aribert Reimann's Troades, staged by Jean-Pierre Ponnelle and conducted by Gerd Albrecht. On 27 January 1987, she took part in the premiere of Flavio Testi's opera Riccardo III at La Scala.

Concert 

In concert, Reppel has performed in oratorios and other choral works, for example in Beethoven's  in 1980. She has sung the lead soprano parts in Verdi's Requiem, Rossini's Stabat Mater, Dvorak's Requiem, Beethoven's Ninth Symphony, and Mahler's Eighth Symphony, among others. She hss also given Lieder concerts with a broad repertoire of songs by Schubert, Schumann, and Wagner, among others.

Concert 

Carmen Reppel lives and teaches in Victoria, British Columbia, Canada.

References

External links 

 
 
 
 Carmen Reppel Vienna State Opera
  Niedersaechsische Staatstheater Hannover programs

Living people
German operatic sopranos
1941 births
People from Gummersbach
Hochschule für Musik und Theater Hamburg alumni